Palaruvil is a tiny village in Kollam district, Kerala in South India. Palaruvi falls is situated in Palaruvi and Palaruvi is famous for Palaruvi waterfalls.

References

External links

Villages in Kollam district